Kalyug may refer to:

 Kalyug (1981 film), a 1981 Hindi language crime film
 Kalyug (2005 film), a Bollywood film based on the pornographic film industry, released on 9 December 2005
Kalyug (novel), 2014 novel by R. Sreeram
 Kali Yuga, in Sanskrit scriptures, is the "Age of Downfall", is the fourth stage of the world development that we are currently in
 Kali Yug: Goddess of Vengeance, a 1963 Italian film